This is a list of compositions by Clara Schumann, initially arranged by genre, sortable by date of completion (click on "Comp.Date" column header).

Complete list of works

References

Sources

 Reich, Nancy B. Clara Schumann: The Artist and the Woman, Revised edition, 2001. pp. 289-337 (Catalogue of Works). Ithaca, NY: Cornell University Press. . 

 New Grove Dictionary of Music and Musicians, 7th edition, 2001. S.v. "Schumann, Clara," by Nancy B. Reich.

 Koch, Paul-August. Clara Wieck-Schumann: (1819-1896): Kompositionen: eine Zusammenstellung der Werke, Literatur und Schallplatten. Frankfurt am Main: Zimmermann; Hofheim am Taunus: F. Hofmeister, 1991, 48 p., ML134.S339 A35. Thematic catalog and discography.

 Schumann, Clara. Sämtliche Lieder für Singstimme und Klavier: Complete Songs for Voice and Piano. Ed. by Joachim Draheim and Brigitte Höft. 2 vols. Wiesbaden: Breitkopf & Härtel, 1990.

 Reich, Nancy B.: "Clara Schumann: The Artist and the Woman". Ithaca: Cornell University Press, 1985. Original edition.

 New Grove Dictionary of Music and Musicians, 6th edition, 1980. S.v. "Schumann, Clara," by Pamela Süsskind.

External links 
 List of works at IMSLP. Free downloadable scores.
 Complete works of Clara Schumann-Wieck, List of compositions.
 Clara Schumann website at Geneva College

 
Schumann, Clara